South Side High School was a public high school located in Memphis, Tennessee and was part of the Memphis City Schools system. In 2007 its location became the home of a specialized school, the South Side Health Career Academy. It was designed by Charles O. Pfeil and George Awsumb.

Notable alumni 
Abe Fortas (SSHS '26), Justice of the Supreme Court of the United States
 Carlton Kent, Sergeant Major of the Marine Corps
Marv Throneberry, baseball player

References

Public high schools in Tennessee
Schools in Memphis, Tennessee

2018 disestablishments in Tennessee